Trisodium N-(1-carboxylatoethyl)iminodiacetate, methylglycinediacetic acid trisodium salt (MGDA-Na3) or trisodium α-DL-alanine diacetate (α-ADA), is the trisodium anion of N-(1-carboxyethyl)iminodiacetic acid and a tetradentate complexing agent. It forms stable 1:1 chelate complexes with cations having a charge number of at least +2, e.g. the "hard water forming" cations Ca2+ or Mg2+. α-ADA is distinguished from the isomeric β-alaninediacetic acid by better biodegradability and therefore improved environmental compatibility.

Production 
The patent literature on the industrial synthesis of trisodium N-(1-carboxylatoethyl)iminodiacetate describes the approaches for solving the key requirements of a manufacturing process that can be implemented on an industrial scale, characterized by

 Achieving the highest possible space-time yields
 Simple reaction control at relatively low pressures and temperatures
 Realization of continuous process options
 Achieving the lowest possible levels of impurities, particularly nitrilotriacetic acid, which is suspected of being carcinogenic
 Use of inexpensive raw materials, e.g. instead of pure L-alanine the raw mixture of Strecker synthesis from methanal, hydrogen cyanide and ammonia
 Avoidance of complex and yield-reducing isolation steps; instead, direct further use of the crude reaction solutions or precipitates in the following process step.

An obvious synthesis route to α-alaninediacetic acid is from racemic α-DL-alanine, which provides racemic α-ADA by double cyanomethylation with methanal and hydrogen cyanide, hydrolysis of the intermediately formed diacetonitrile to the trisodium salt and subsequent acidification with mineral acids in a 97.4% overall yield. In a later patent specification, however, only an overall yield of 77%  and an NTA content of 0.1% is achieved with practically the same quantities of substances and under practically identical reaction conditions.

This later patent specification also indicates a process route via alaninonitrile, which is obtained by Strecker synthesis from hydrogen cyanide, ammonia and methanal and converted to methylglycinonitrile-N,N-diacetonitrile by double cyanomethylation (step 1). The three nitrile groups are then hydrolyzed with sodium hydroxide to α-ADA (step 2). The total yield is given as 72%, the NTA content as 0.07%.

One variant of the reaction involves iminodiacetonitrile or iminodiacetic acid (step 1'), which reacts in a weakly acidic medium (pH 6) with hydrogen cyanide and ethanal to form methylglycinonitrile-N,N-diacetic acid, the nitrile group of which is hydrolyzed with sodium hydroxide to trisodium N-(1-carboxylatoethyl)iminodiacetate (step 2'). The reactant iminodiacetic acid is accessible at low cost by dehydrogenation of diethanolamine. Again, the total yield is given as 72%, the NTA content as 0.07%.

A further variant is suitable for continuous production, in which ammonia, methanal and hydrogen cyanide react at pH 6 to form iminodiacetonitrile, which in a strongly acidic medium (pH 1.5) reacts with ethanal to produce trinitrile methylglycinonitrile-N,N-diacetonitrile in a very good yield of 92%. (step 1).

Alkaline hydrolysis (step 2) results in a total yield of 85% trisodium N-(1-carboxylatoethyl)iminodiacetate with an NTA content of 0.08%. This process variant seems to fulfil the above-mentioned criteria best.

A low by-product synthesis route for trisodium N-(1-carboxylatoethyl)iminodiacetate has recently been described, in which alanine is ethoxylated with ethylene oxide in an autoclave to form bis-hydroxyethylaminoalanine and then oxidized to α-ADA at 190 °C with Raney copper under pressure.

The yields are over 90% d.Th., the NTA contents below 1%. The process conditions make this variant rather less attractive.

Properties 
The commercially available trisodium N-(1-carboxylatoethyl)iminodiacetate (84% by weight) is a colourless, water-soluble solid whose aqueous solutions are rapidly and completely degraded even by non-adapted bacteria. Aquatic toxicity to fish, daphnia and algae is low. Trisodium N-(1-carboxylatoethyl)iminodiacetate is described as readily biodegradable (OECD 301C) and is eliminated to >90 %  in wastewater treatment plants. Trisodium N-(1-carboxylatoethyl)iminodiacetate has not yet been detected in the discharge of municipal and industrial sewage treatment plants. In addition to their very good biodegradability, trisodium N-(1-carboxylatoethyl)iminodiacetate solutions are characterized by high chemical stability even at temperatures above 200 °C (under pressure) in a wide pH range between 2 and 14 as well as high complex stability compared to other complexing agents of the aminopolycarboxylate type.

The following table shows the complexing constants log K of α-ADA compared to tetrasodium iminodisuccinate and ethylenediaminetetraacetic acid (EDTA) versus polyvalent metal ions:

The complex formation constants of the biodegradable chelators α-ADA and IDS are in a range suitable for industrial use, but clearly below those of the previous standard EDTA.

In solid preparations, trisodium N-(1-carboxylatoethyl)iminodiacetate is stable against oxidizing agents such as perborates and percarbonates, but not against oxidizing acids or sodium hypochlorite.

Use 
Like other complexing agents in the aminopolycarboxylic acid class, trisodium N-(1-carboxylatoethyl)iminodiacetate (α-ADA)  finds due to its ability to form stable chelate complexes with polyvalent ions (in particular the water hardening agents Ca2+ and Mg2+, as well as transition and heavy metal ions such as Fe3+, Mn2+, Cu2+, etc.) use in water softening, in detergents and cleaning agents, in electroplating, cosmetics, paper and textile production. Due to its stability at high temperatures and pH values, α-ADA should be particularly suitable as a substitute for the phosphates banned in the EU from 2017, such as sodium tripolyphosphate (STPP) in tabs for dishwashers.

BASF SE is the most important manufacturer of α-ADA under the brand name Trilon M, has large-scale plants in Ludwigshafen and Lima, Ohio, and is currently expanding its existing capacities with another large-scale plant at Evonik's site in Theodore, Alabama.

References 

Amino acids
Organic sodium salts